Lieutenant General Nadeem Ahmed Anjum is a three-star general in the Pakistan Army and is currently serving as the Director-General of the ISI since 20 November 2021.

Military career
He was commissioned in the 28th Punjab Regiment and is from the 77th PMA Long Course.

He served as the Inspector-General of the Frontier Corps in Balochistan from December 2016 to December 2018.

He has also served as Corps Commander of the V Corps from December 2020 to October 2021.

Press Conference of October 2022
In a highly unprecedented move, DG ISI Nadeem made a surprising appearance at a press conference alongside DG ISPR Babar Iftikhar, after the former had opted to stay out of the public eye. 

This marked the first time that the head of the ISI gave a live briefing, or even addressed the media.

The pair addressed and answered multiple issues that were taking place at the time, especially regarding Lettergate, Arshad Sharif's death, the failed assassination attempt on former Prime Minister Imran Khan, the military's support of Shahbaz Sharif amidst the alleged involvement of General Bajwa towards Imran Khan's ouster, and Khan's Azadi March 2022.

Regarding the Lettergate affair, Anjum asserted that during the National Security Committee of Pakistan's meeting on the cypher, Anjum "categorically clarified" that there was "no evidence found" regarding a foreign conspiracy to oust the PTI-led government. Rather, Anjum accused the incumbent federal government of fueling "speculation and disinformation" with the aim of "scoring political gains", whilst "feeding" this narrative to Arshad Sharif as well as other journalists. However, in the National Security Committee meeting on the cypher, both civil and military leadership jointly agreed that the cypher represented a "blatant interference in the internal affairs of Pakistan", and issued a demarche to the Acting US envoy in Islamabad in response.

Appointment as DG ISI
At the beginning of October 2021 the Prime Minister's Office formally received three names from the COAS for the appointment of a new Director-General of the ISI, including Lt. Gen. Nadeem Anjum, Lt. Gen. Sarfraz Ali and Lt. Gen. Saqib Malik.

He was de facto appointed by the Chief of Army Staff, following an announcement by the DG ISPR.  However, the PM's secretariat did not issue a notification in this regard until 26 October 2021. Prime Minister Imran Khan announced to make a consultation for this important future assignment.

After being appointed as DGISI, Anjum issued orders restricting photos and videos of him during official meetings be released to the media. 

Anjum's tenure as head of the ISI has marked a sharp increase in the military high command's harassment of  media voices critical to the Shehbaz Sharif-led government and the military leadership.

Journalist Arshad Sharif, who was forced to flee from the country after being charged with sedition over criticizing the military, was subsequently murdered in Kenya.

In his historic press briefing, Anjum stated that
he did not see any significant threats posed to Sharif's life which would have forced him to flee the country, however, months after the presser, Arshad Sharif's mother publicly accused a number of senior-ranking officers, including former Army Chief General Bajwa and Nadeem Anjum, of conspiring for the "targeted, premeditated, planned and calculated murder" of her son, claiming that Sharif was threatened by the agency after insinuating in a program called “Woh Kon Tha”, (aired on ARY News) that Anjum had played a major part in Imran Khan's ouster.

Effective dates of promotion

References

External links 
 ISI chief Nadeem Anjum in hot water over Pakistan Taliban attacks, Intelligence Online, February 17, 2023 (requires free registration)

Living people
Pakistani generals
Directors General of Inter-Services Intelligence
Year of birth missing (living people)
Lieutenant generals
Pakistan Army personnel
Recipients of Tamgha-e-Imtiaz
Pakistan Military Academy alumni
Pakistan Army officers
Punjab Regiment officers
National Defence University, Pakistan alumni
Alumni of King's College London
Graduates of the Royal College of Defence Studies